Super Duper Sumos (Korean: 으랏차차 삼총사) is an animated series co-produced by DIC Entertainment, L.P. and Ameko Entertainment. It was created by Kevin O'Donnell and Vincent Nguyen.

Overview
Three crimefighting sumo wrestlers — the brothers Booma, Kimo, and Mamoo — go on adventures and fight using their enormous size and gigantic hindquarters.

A typical episode consisted of "Bad Inc" trying to destroy Generic City in numerously themed ways, although almost all of their plans involved giant monsters. The head of Bad Inc, Ms. Mister, usually assigned the in-house mad scientist Stinger to create these evil monsters. At the end of each episode, Ms. Mister fires Stinger for failing to create an unstoppable monster (although he always appears employed in the next episode and is never actually fired). Every episode contained gratuitous use of the word "butt".

In every episode, the three wrestlers use "Sumo Size". This makes them stronger, more muscular, and considerably larger. Each sumo has a characteristic move they use when "Sumo Sized", usually the three sumos initiate their attack one after another in the same order. Often in times of trouble, the sumos undertake a flashback remembering something Wisdom San (their teacher) taught them. They also may get advice from Prima, who is the sumos' friend and encouraging sidekick who often follows them and acts the most sensibly. Throughout the whole series, each sumo fights for their own cause (they draw their abilities from a force known as 'P.H.A.T.', standing for Peace, Honor And Truth).

Characters

Super Duper Sumos
 Mamoo: The Afro-Caribbean sumo who is their most sensible member and unofficial leader, fighting for Truth. He likes to cook as well as eat and was disheartened after losing a cooking challenge on a show sponsored by Bad Inc, regaining his confidence after realizing that the challenge was (obviously) rigged. His special move is 'Sumo Squeeze', where he grabs an opponent from behind and gives them a powerful bear hug.
 Kimo: The Asian sumo who resembles a samurai and has a Zen-like attitude to life, fighting for Honor. He is apparently precognitive, as his younger self foresaw the Sumos' battles against Bad Inc. First evidenced in "Dance Of The Sugar Plumb Sumos", he also has a habit of making corny one-liners when claiming victory, much to his own amusement and Mamoo's chagrin. His special move is 'Honorable Thunderball', which involves him rolling into a ball and launching himself at an opponent.
 Booma: The Caucasian sumo who talks like a surfer and is the most enthusiastic and child-like, fighting for Peace. He is obsessed with his large butt and proudly talks about it in every episode. His special move is 'Gluteus Maximus', involving him landing on an opponent butt-first and squashing them.

Allies
 Prima: A small, thin girl who acts as the Sumos' friend and helps them out as she can, although their dimwitted and childish ways often annoy her. She has a Japanese accent and appearance.
 Wisdom San: The Sumos' yogi-like teacher, who raised them from infancy and taught them the ways of P.H.A.T. He is usually seen in flashbacks, but sometimes appears in contemporary sections of the episode. He resembles an Eastern mystic, seems to wear nothing apart from sandals (although this is debatable, as his beard covers most of his body), and is often seen meditating, levitating, or both. He found raising the Sumos incredibly frustrating due to their greed and clumsiness.
 Shemo: The Sumos' long-lost sister was separated from them as a baby when baby Booma accidentally knocked her down Wisdom San's mountain home. She was consequently raised by a herd of yaks (who somehow knew the ways of P.H.A.T.) and grew up to be the superheroic guardian of Kyoto and its yak population. When Bad Inc devastated the city and kidnapped the yaks and the mayor, Shemo traveled to Generic City to get them back. She turned out to be a better fighter than the boys and turned down their help, but they had to rescue her after Bad Inc captured her. The four Sumos defeated Bad Inc together and Shemo, politely refusing the offer to stay with her 'brothers', returned to Kyoto.
 The Gyoji: A mute, goofy-looking Gyōji that appears in most episodes whenever the Sumos are about to fight. A running gag is him emerging from a nearby area (such as a mailbox) to observe the battle.

Bad Inc
 Ms. Mister: The main villain of the show.  The cruel CEO of Bad Inc is constantly infuriated by their inability to defeat the Sumos.
 Billy "BS" Swift: Invariably clad in a black polo neck and sunglasses, he seems to be the administration of Bad Inc. Dr. Stinger seems to view him as a love rival, but BS has no interest in Ms. Mister (apart from trying to make sure their plan actually works so she won't yell at him), whom BS curiously refers to as "Mum" once early on in the show.
 Dr. Stinger: A green-skinned, hunchbacked mad scientist who is employed to create the various giant monsters and robots used in Bad Inc's plans. He is romantically obsessed with Ms. Mister and a bit too childish to be an effective villain. A running gag is Ms. Mister firing him, usually very loudly.
 Ghengis Fangus: A ghostly entity that constantly lectures the other villains, insisting that evil was more effective in his day. He tried to conquer the world long ago but was opposed and thwarted by Wisdom San. He claims to have been close friends with Napoleon Bonaparte and Attila the Hun in his youth.
 The Evil Sumos: Originally created to oppose the Super Duper Sumos, they occasionally make reappearances acting as Bad Inc's 'muscle'. They consist of He of the Extra Arms (counterpart of Mamoo), He of the Big Iron Chest (counterpart of Kimo), and He of the Third Butt Cheek (counterpart of Booma).

Episode list

Running gags
 Booma always talks about his butt.
 Stinger keeps getting fired by Ms. Mister in every ending episode.
 The sumos keep doing flashbacks to their time of training with Wisdom San.
 The gag monster "Coathanger" that Dr. Stinger created appears in several episodes.

Voice cast 
 Matt Hill as Booma
 Ben Hurston as Kimo
 Cusse Mankuma as Mamoo
 Chantal Strand as Prima
 Richard Newman as Wisdom San
 Deborah DeMille as Ms. Mister
 Michael Dobson as Genghis Fangus/Billy Swift
 Peter Kelamis as Dr. Stinger

Additional voice cast 
 Kathleen Barr -
 Ian James Corlett -
 Brenda Crichlow -
 Gail Fabrey -
 Jason Michas -
 Brent Miller -
 Shirley Millner -
 Colin Murdock -

Guest stars 
 Danny Mann -
 Babz Chula -
 Cam Clarke -
 Kevin Schon -

Production
In October 1999, DIC Entertainment (then-owned by The Walt Disney Company) teamed up with South Korean firm Ameko Entertainment to produce three animated shows, with Super Duper Sumos being the first as part of the deal. This would be the first time DIC would partner with a Korean company to co-producing an animated series and not just outsource.

The production of the series began in July 2000. DIC handled worldwide distribution for the property except in Korea, where Ameko distributed the series.

The series debuted in the United Kingdom first on BBC's CBBC block on Saturday Mornings. The show was sold to Antena 3 (Spain), YTV (Canada), Mediaset (Italy), Foxtel (Australia, to air on Fox Kids), Fox Kids (Latin America), Disney Channel (Asia), and RCTV (Venezuela). DIC signed a European deal with the UK-based toy company Martin Yaffe International to develop a toy and merchandising line based on the property, alongside DIC's Consumer Products division handling other kinds of merchandising.

Broadcast
The show first aired in the United Kingdom on CBBC on September 22, 2001,  and then eventually aired in the United States on Nickelodeon on October 13, 2002.

In 2003, the series was pre-sold to Disney Channel in France.

Home media releases
In 2002, ADV Films acquired the distribution rights to the series on VHS and DVD, and in February 2003, released "They've got Guts!" on VHS and DVD, consisting of the first 5 episodes of the series. ADV would later release 5 more volumes throughout that year.

In July 2010, Mill Creek Entertainment released a 10 episode best-of collection entitled Super Duper Sumos: They've Got Guts! on DVD in Region 1 which also includes a bonus episode of World of Quest.

Video game
A video game based on the series for the Game Boy Advance was developed by Midway Games and released on October 26, 2003. A PlayStation 2 game was planned but never surfaced.

References

External links
 

2001 American television series debuts
2003 American television series endings
2001 South Korean television series debuts
2003 South Korean television series endings
2002 video games
2000s American animated television series
2000s South Korean animated television series
American children's animated action television series
American children's animated adventure television series
American children's animated comedy television series
Game Boy Advance games
Game Boy Advance-only games
Fictional sumo wrestlers
North America-exclusive video games
Sumo mass media
Television series by DIC Entertainment
Video games based on television series
Video games developed in the United States
Midway video games
Cancelled PlayStation 2 games
Tooniverse original programming
Transforming heroes
Fictional trios